José Veloso Abueva (May 25, 1928 – August 18, 2021) was a Filipino political scientist and public administration scholar who served as the 16th president of the University of the Philippines. A Ten Outstanding Young Men (TOYM) awardee for political science in 1962, he has devoted much of his career in academic circles. He has been faculty member of the National College of Public Administration and Governance of the University of the Philippines Diliman and visiting professor at Brooklyn College, City University of New York and Yale University. He has also worked with the United Nations University in Tokyo. Abueva's service to the nation includes stints as secretary of the 1971 Constitutional Convention, executive director of the Legislative-Executive Local Government Reform Commission and Chairman of the Legislative-Executive Council that drew up the conversion program for former military bases. Abueva wrote a number of books, including Focus in the Barrio: The Foundation of the Philippine Community Development Program and Ang Filipino sa Siglo 21.  Among the publications he has edited is the 20-volume PAMANA: The UP Anthology of Filipino Socio-Political Thought since 1872.

Abueva was a professor emeritus of political science and public administration at the University of the Philippines Diliman. He also chaired the advisory board of the Citizens Movement for a Free Philippines. He was appointed by President Gloria Macapagal Arroyo as chairman of the consultative constitutional commission in the Philippines. He was also a strong supporter of federalism and parliamentary government for the Philippines.

He formed the team of analysts of Pulse Asia, a public opinion polling body in the Philippines.

Abueva was the founder and former president of Kalayaan College.

Biography and career
Abueva was born in Tagbilaran City, Bohol, on May 25, 1928, to Teodoro Lloren Abueva, a former Bohol congressman and Purificacion (Nena) Veloso, head of Bohol's Women's Club and women's suffrage campaign.

As a young boy of 16 during World War II in the Philippines, he had to search for his parents, who were taken by the Japanese, eventually finding them dead.

Abueva has six other brothers and sisters: Teodoro (Teddy), Jr., (dec.); Purificacion (Neny - dec.), married to Atty. Ramon Binamira (dec.) of Tagbilaran City; Napoleon Abueva (Billy), Philippines National Artist for sculpture; Amelia (Inday) Martinez,  now living in Chicago; Teresita (Ching) Floro, now living in Sydney, Australia; and Antonio (Tony), a landscape artist.

Abueva served as president of the University of the Philippines in 1987–1993. He introduced the Socialized Tuition Fee Assistance Program (STFAP) in 1987. Abueva also institutionalized a Filipino language policy within the university.

He was a president of Kalayaan College as well as U.P. Professor of Political Science and Public Administration.

Abueva was married to Ma Socorro (Coring) Encarnacion Abueva (dec.) from Surigao and Manila. Their children are Lanelle, Jobert, Rosanna and Jonas.

Abueva died on August 18, 2021 in Antipolo, Rizal.

Significant contributions to Philippine governance 
On September 4, 2007, the Presidential Task Force on Education under the Office of the President named Bienvenido Nebres, chairman. Nebres was joined by 4 others—Angeles University Foundation president Emmanuel Angeles, Philippine Chamber of Commerce and Industry president Donald Dy, Asian Institute of Management professor Victor Limlingan, and former University of the Philippines president Jose Abueva. The 5 with Education Secretary Jesli Lapus, Romulo Neri, and Augusto Syjuco, complete the task force. Gloria Macapagal Arroyo signed Executive Order 635 on August 24 creating a presidential task force to assess, plan and monitor the entire educational system.

Quotes 
 "There were many reasons (for the proposal to scrap the 2007 polls). That is just one of them." (referring to popularity)
 "Our electoral system may not be reformed at that time (2007). This would raise questions on the credibility of the elections."
 "I respect his (Ramos) opinion but I am standing with the commission's recommendation. He is entitled to his opinions but we should look at the substantive proposals."
 "Throughout history, there have been many leaders of war, but there have been few leaders of peace. I am determined to help change this."

References

Further reading 

 Jose V. Abueva Some Advantages of Federalism and Parliamentary Government for the Philippines Philippine Center for Investigative Journalism Retrieved 13 December 2006.
 Jose V. Abueva. Consolidating our fragile democracy ABS-CBN Interactive December 13, 2006.
 Maila Ager Under new form of gov't Arroyo can finish term as transition PM--Abueva Seen as part of transition Philippine Daily Inquirer July 28, 2005.
 Cesar Torres Jose V. Abueva and the Philippine Constitution in California - an appeal to the power elite in the Philippines SamarNews June 10, 2006.
 
 Jaime Pilapil Criticisms drown out One Voice Manila Standard Today June 29, 2006.
 Lira Dalangin-Fernandez Abueva chosen head of Charter consultative body Philippine Daily Inquirer September 28, 2005.
 Ronnie E. Calumpita and Maricel V. Cruz  Abueva: Gov't shift will impact on GMA’s term Manila Times November 9, 2005.
 Proposed Charter changes to reflect views of Filipinos nationwide - Con-Com www.news.ops.gov.ph  October 12, 2005.
 Abueva Speaks Before SF Community On Charter Change Consulate General of the Philippines 24 April 2006.
 Sam Mediavilla Charter panel to tackle only specific provisions The Manila Times October 13, 2005.
 Books by Jose Veloso Abueva
 Edmundo Santuario III Federalism: Antidote to Separatism? Part 1
 Edmundo Santuario III Federalism: Antidote to Separatism? Part 2

External links 
 Consultative Commission

1928 births
2021 deaths
Filipino educators
Filipino political scientists
Filipino journalists
People from Tagbilaran
Boholano people
University of the Philippines alumni
University of Michigan alumni
Arroyo administration personnel
Presidents of universities and colleges in the Philippines
Brooklyn College faculty